Hailing may refer to:

Hail, a form of frozen precipitation
Hailing District (海陵区), Taizhou, Jiangsu, China
Hailing, Yangjiang (海陵镇), town in Jiangcheng District, Yangjiang, Guangdong, China
Prince of Hailing (disambiguation), several Chinese princes
Hailing, a municipal part of Leiblfing, Bavaria, Germany